"Never Ceases to Amaze Me" is a song by New Zealand art rock group Split Enz. It was released in September 1982 as the third single from the group's eighth studio album, Time and Tide.

The video clip was shot in a zoo and featured Tim Finn as a groundskeeper, with the rest of the band in Star Trek style uniforms.

Track listing
Released as 7" vinyl record in Australia only.
"Never Ceases to Amaze Me"
"I See Red (Live)"

Personnel
 Tim Finn - vocals, piano
 Neil Finn - vocals, guitar
 Noel Crombie - drums, percussion
 Nigel Griggs - bass
 Eddie Rayner - percussion, keyboards

Charts

Notes

Split Enz songs
1982 singles
Songs written by Tim Finn
1982 songs
Mushroom Records singles